The Relief Committee for Greeks of Asia Minor (1917–1921) was a relief organization established during World War I in response to the genocide of Greeks in the Ottoman Empire. The committee was also known as simply the Greek Relief Committee.

Executive Board

Chairman: Frank W. Jackson
Honorary Chairman: Jacob Gould Schurman
Vice-Chairman: Basile D. Dugundji
Secretary: John P. Xenides
Treasurer: Abraham E. Kazan (resigned in November 1917), Rollin P. Grant

Operations

The GRC worked through a network of foreign consuls, missionaries and relief workers located at various points in the Ottoman Empire. In doing so, its working methods were similar to those of the  American Committee for Armenian and Syrian Relief (ACASR), which was also in action during World War I. It also cooperated with American diplomatic institutions in Athens and Thessaloniki to aid refugees arriving from Turkey.

References

Greek genocide
Humanitarian aid organizations of World War I